Aimargues is a railway station in Aimargues, Occitanie, southern France. Within TER Occitanie, it is part of line 26 (Nîmes-Le Grau-du-Roi).

References

Railway stations in Gard
Railway stations in France opened in 1868